Pumla is a given name and may refer to:

Pumla Gobodo-Madikizela (born 1955), research professor at the University of the Free State in South Africa
Pumla Kisosonkole (1911–1997), Ugandan politician and activist in women's organizations
Makaziwe Mandela (born Pumla Makaziwe Mandela-Amuah, 1954), daughter of Nelson Mandela and Evelyn Mase